The Hilary Weston Writers' Trust Prize for Nonfiction is a Canadian literary award, presented annually by the Writers' Trust of Canada to the best work of non-fiction by a Canadian writer.

Sponsorship history
First established in 1997, the award's original corporate sponsor was Viacom. Pearson Canada, an educational book publishing company, took over the award in 1999, and Nereus Financial, a stock brokerage, became the sponsor from 2006 to 2008. After Nereus dropped its sponsorship, the award had no corporate sponsor until 2011, when philanthropist and former Lieutenant Governor of Ontario Hilary Weston was announced as the award's new sponsor.

Nominees and winners

References

External links
 Hilary Weston Writers' Trust Prize for Nonfiction

Writers' Trust of Canada awards
Canadian non-fiction literary awards
Awards established in 1997
1997 establishments in Canada
English-language literary awards